Elliot Ragomo (born 28 May 1990)  is a futsal player from the Solomon Islands. He plays as a defender for Brazilian club Minas Tênis Clube in the Liga Nacional de Futsal and the Solomon Islands national futsal team. Ragomo is the first futsal player from the Solomon Islands who plays professionally.

Club career
Ragomo came through the youth ranks of Marist and made his debut for the club in 2015. In 2017 he transferred to Brazilian side Minas Tênis Clube.

International career
Ragomo made his debut at the age of 18 for the Solomon Islands national futsal team during the 2008 FIFA Futsal World Cup in a 10–2 loss against Cuba. He has also played for and captained the Kurukuru in the three World Cups that followed.

References

1990 births
Living people
Futsal defenders
Solomon Islands footballers
Solomon Islands international footballers
Association football forwards
Solomon Islands men's futsal players
Marist F.C. players
Minas Tênis Clube players